HNLMS Piet Hein was a  of the Royal Netherlands Navy.

Design
The main armament of the ship was three  guns in a double and single turret. Secondary armament included two single  guns and six single  guns.

Service history
The ship was laid down in 1893 at the Nederlandsche Stoomboot Maatschappij in Rotterdam and launched on 16 August 1894. The ship was commissioned on 3 January 1896.
On 11 May 1896 during the harbor strikes in Rotterdam a ban on assembly was declared. Two days later  patrolled the Meuse. The ship was later relieved by her sister ships , Piet Hein and the police schooner Argus. 300 grenadiers were deployed during the strikes. The strikes were ended on 21 may.

Piet Hein returned in February 1901 to Soerabaja in the Dutch East Indies.

The ships was finally decommissioned in 1914.

Notes

References
Staatsbegrooting voor het dienstjaar 1897 (2.-VI.-5.)

Coastal defence ships of the Royal Netherlands Navy
1894 ships
Ships built in Rotterdam